is a light novel series by Ichirō Sakaki with illustrations by Yō Fujishiro, published by Fujimi Shobo under their Fujimi Fantasia Bunko imprint. It was published in 11 volumes between 2000 and 2010. The series was adapted into a 3-episode original video animation series in 2007. A film version of the OVA aired in the United States on the Syfy channel.

Plot
Strait Jacket is set an alternate history where magic was proven to exist in the year 1899. The use of sorcery spread throughout all facets of society and changed the social and technological development of the world. The location is Tristan, an urban metropolis that appears to be an amalgamation of turn-of-the-20th-century Tokyo, San Francisco, and Victorian-era London.

Alongside this technology and science exists magic, which has been proven possible in public demonstrations by Dr. George Greco. Although the use of magic is only possible for a few talented individuals, it is very dangerous and highly illegal. Due to an invisible contaminant called the "malediction", or simply the "curse", people who use magic too often are at risk in transforming into "Demons", or horrific, malevolent abominations of nature that become immune to ordinary weapons. The Magic Administration Bureau, also known as the Sorcery Management Bureau, is set up in the attempt to safely explore the nature of magic, officially document it, attempt to provide rational scientific explanation for it, regulate its use and police those who use magic illegally. Magic, utilized in a safe sense by the Bureau, has been used as a viable energy source by the civil service, industry, agriculture, medicine, and the military. Effectively, the Magic Administration Bureau is now in control of every field and every facet of society.

The primary enemies of the Bureau are Oddman, a former left-wing terrorist cell, turned mercenary. All of these magic users, even the ones with innocent and well-meaning intentions, are in danger of tapping into the dark side either accidentally or on purpose and themselves becoming bloodthirsty beasts due to accidents or sabotage by Oddman's agents. These Sorcerist agents wear a suit of armor that resists the negative transforming effects of magic. These suits are referred to as "Mold Armor", or more commonly a "straitjacket", due to the fact they constrain human beings in their natural form. The Sorcerists also use magically tainted bullets from large hand-carried railguns powered by a combination of steam and magic, which are the only weapons capable of effectively stopping the magically transformed monsters.

However, the over-stretched Bureau is steadily losing ground and increasingly must rely on outside help. There simply aren't enough Sorcerists to fight the Demons caused by Oddman's sabotage. This leads to an increase in accidental demonic transformations and attacks on the public across Tristan. Among those who fight the Demons is an unlicensed, rogue Sorcerist named Leiot Steinberg, who is viewed as a loose cannon bringing the name of Sorcerists into disrepute and causing as much damage as the Demons in his one-man war against them. Yet the Bureau is forced to reluctantly call upon his services in their losing battle. Because Steinberg fights against a sin he committed long ago, even with his Mold Armor he comes closer and closer to transforming into a Demon every time he casts a spell.

Characters

Media

Light novels
The Strait Jacket was written by Ichirō Sakaki with illustrations by Yō Fujishiro. The light novel series was published by Fujimi Shobo in 11 volumes between 2000 and 2010.

Extra

OVA
In 2007 a three-episode original video animation based on the light novel was produced by Feel. The OVA series has been licensed for English-language translation and DVD release in the United States, Canada and the United Kingdom by Manga Entertainment. A film version was aired on the Sci-Fi Channel as part of their Ani-Monday programming block on October 20, 2008.

Reception
The light novel series currently has sold over half a million copies.

References

External links
 Anime official site (archive) 
 
 
 
 Music release Werd (S.O.S) Concept EP based on film.

2000 Japanese novels
2007 anime OVAs
Anime and manga based on light novels
Feel (animation studio)
Fujimi Fantasia Bunko
Kadokawa Dwango franchises
Ichirō Sakaki
Light novels
Novels about magic
Steampunk anime and manga